Michael Adrian Midwood (born 19 April 1976) is an English former professional footballer who played as a striker in the Football League for Huddersfield Town, and in the Hong Kong First Division League for Happy Valley and Instant-Dict.

He also played non-League football for clubs including Halifax Town. He is now manager of Ealandians A.F.C.

References

1976 births
Living people
Footballers from Burnley
English footballers
Association football forwards
Huddersfield Town A.F.C. players
Macclesfield Town F.C. players
Halifax Town A.F.C. players
Accrington Stanley F.C. players
Happy Valley AA players
Glentoran F.C. players
Wakefield F.C. players
Doncaster Rovers F.C. players
Double Flower FA players
Ossett Town F.C. players
Farsley Celtic A.F.C. players
English Football League players
Hong Kong First Division League players
Expatriate footballers in Hong Kong
English expatriate sportspeople in Hong Kong
English expatriate footballers